"7 Rings" (stylized in all lowercase) is a song by American singer Ariana Grande, from her fifth studio album Thank U, Next. It was released as the album's second single on January 18, 2019, through Republic Records. The song was written by Grande, Victoria Monét, Tayla Parx, Njomza, and Kaydence, alongside its producers Tommy Brown, Charles Anderson, and Michael Foster, with additional writing credits going to Rodgers and Hammerstein for an interpolation of their song "My Favorite Things".

"7 Rings" broke numerous streaming records upon release. It debuted at number-one on the Billboard Hot 100, becoming Grande's second consecutive number-one in the United States. The single ultimately became her top-performing song on the chart, spending eight weeks at number one and 33 weeks on the chart overall. Internationally, the song reached the top of record charts in over 25 countries, as well as the top ten in 10 other countries. With sales of over 13.3 million copies worldwide as of December 2019, "7 Rings" is one of the best-selling songs in digital history.

The song received nominations for Record of the Year and Best Pop Solo Performance at the 62nd Annual Grammy Awards. Its accompanying music video, directed by Hannah Lux Davis, was critically acclaimed and won Best Art Direction at the 2019 MTV Video Music Awards. A remix of the song, featuring American rapper 2 Chainz, was released on February 1, 2019.

Background and release
A few weeks prior to the track's release, Republic Records contacted Imagem/Concord Music, who owns the Rodgers & Hammerstein publishing rights, and agreed to give them 90 percent of the song's songwriting royalties, in order to acquire the rights to release the song. Grande first teased the track in the music video for "Thank U, Next", in which the first few seconds of the instrumental are used in the opening sequence, and the license plate of the car she drives reads "7 RINGS". The day after the video was released, Grande confirmed the existence of "7 Rings" and revealed the moment that inspired it on Twitter.

The singer described the song as "a friendship anthem", later posting the single's artwork on Instagram along with its release date, January 18.

Composition and lyrics

"7 Rings" is a trap-pop song with elements of hip hop and R&B that runs for 3 minutes, with Grande rapping the hook and final verse. It features a heavy bass and sees Grande discuss "how global success has allowed her to enjoy the finer things". Billboard magazine noted it's "the most hip-hop-leaning song Grande has released in the post-Sweetener era yet, with Grande almost rapping the song's verses".

The song channels the melody of The Sound of Musics "My Favorite Things" in the verses: "Breakfast at Tiffany's/And bottles of bubbles/Girls with tattoos who like getting in trouble/Lashes and diamonds, ATM machines/Buy myself all of my favorite things". The song also interpolates The Notorious B.I.G.'s "Gimme the Loot" in the bridge. Grande and her team agreed to sign away 90% of the track's songwriting royalties at the request of the Concord music company.

Grande described the song as a "friendship anthem" that "evolves" from previous single "Thank U, Next" while embracing a new chapter. She opens up about how her breakup with Pete Davidson led her to "treating her friends instead".

"7 Rings" is written in the key of C# minor in common time with a tempo of 140 beats per minute. The song contains rapping segments however in the singing parts, Grande's vocals span from G3 to E5.

Critical reception
The song received generally positive reviews. Rolling Stones Brittany Spanos review of "7 Rings" was positive, calling it "dangerously fun, and as deliriously intoxicating as the champagne at Tiffany’s with all your best bitches." Markos Papadatos from Digital Journal praised Grande's vocals as "smooth and crystalline with a retro vibe to it" and said Grande has shown "consistency with the radio singles that she has put out, and each song stands out from a sonic and lyrical standpoint. "7 rings" is no different." Jamieson Cox from Pitchfork was mixed in her review and said the song "[is] a letdown given all of the hype. This is The Sound of Musics 'My Favorite Things' as flipped by Regina George, and its sneering tone is a far cry from Sweeteners benevolence..." The Atlantics editor, Spencer Kornhaber, criticized the song, writing:
[the single] is raising hackles because it regresses to a more cartoonish, and imitative, use of black music than she's done before (not to mention the video's evocation of Japanese kawaii). She's wearing the culture as a costume—or even as a joke—not unlike white frat guys putting on fake grills for a "ratchet" party.

Year-end list

Accolades

Commercial performance

"7 Rings" earned over 14,9 million plays in its first 24 hours on Spotify, breaking the platform's all-time counter record. However, only 8.5 million of these counted towards Spotify's Top 200 chart dated January 18, 2019. The song also broke the Spotify weekly record with over 70 million streams in its first week on the platform.

In the United States, "7 Rings" debuted at number one on the Billboard Hot 100 issue dated February 2, 2019, becoming Grande's second number-one single, following "Thank U, Next", and the 33rd song to do so. With this, Grande joined Carey (3) and Britney Spears (2) as the only female artists with multiple number-one debuts; and at the time she was overall the fifth artist after Justin Bieber and Drake. She later broke the overall record with the number one debuts of "Stuck with U" and "Rain on Me". Grande also became the first artist to have their first two number-ones debut at the top spot. Among component charts, "7 Rings" debuted at the top of the Streaming Songs chart with 85.3 million US streams in the week ending January 24, 2019, according to Nielsen Music; the sum marked the second-biggest streaming week ever for a song by a female artist (after the aforementioned "Thank U, Next"). It also debuted at number one on the Digital Songs chart with 96,000 downloads. As the second single to her fifth album Thank U, Next, Grande had two singles that debuted at number one on the chart, making Grande the third artist in history to have an album with two songs that debuted at number one on the Hot 100, after Drake's Scorpion in 2018 and Mariah Carey's Daydream in 1995. "7 Rings" held the top spot for a fourth week following the release of her album Thank U, Next, blocking her singles "Break Up with Your Girlfriend, I'm Bored" (which debuted at number two), and "Thank U, Next" (which rose up to number three). With three songs in the top 3, Grande became the first artist in history since The Beatles in 1964 to occupy the top 3 spots on the chart and the first and only solo artist to ever achieve this record. "7 Rings" remained atop the Hot 100 for eight non-consecutive weeks until it was unseated by "Old Town Road" by Lil Nas X and descended to number three on April 13, 2019. It remained in the top ten for its first 16 weeks until it fell to number 11 on May 25, 2019.

In the UK, "7 Rings" became Grande's fourth number one in the country. The single sold 126,000 units, becoming Grande's biggest opening week. It also set the record for the most streams of a song in a week with 16.9 million streams. On the issue dated 21 February 2019, "7 Rings" was replaced by "Break Up with Your Girlfriend, I'm Bored", making Grande the second female artist to occupy the top two positions on the UK Singles Chart and the first female artist to self-replace on the top of the chart. The song reclaimed the summit position the following week, pushing "Break Up with Your Girlfriend, I'm Bored" down to number two, and thus making Grande the first artist in the chart's history to self-replace for two consecutive weeks. As of March 2021, "7 Rings" is Grande's third most-streamed song in the United Kingdom and overall 18th most-streamed song by a female artist in the country.

In Australia, the song debuted at number one, becoming Grande's 3rd number one single.

Music video

Background and reception
Grande shared a preview of the music video on January 14, 2019. The video itself premiered on January 18, 2019, on Grande's YouTube channel. The video features many of Grande's close friends, with whom a shopping trip inspired the song.

The music video was directed by Hannah Lux Davis, who also directed the music videos for Grande's previous singles, "Breathin" and "Thank U, Next".

Billboard magazine called the pink-colored video "sassy", as Grande and her friends flash their diamond rings at a luxurious party in a "mansion that's decked with diamonds, graffiti, and a champagne tower". Digital Journal gave it an A rating, calling it "distinct and remarkable. It is creative and artistic and it will resonate with her fans." The "7 Rings" music video earned 23.6 million views in its first 24 hours. On June 1, 2021, it surpassed 1 billion views on YouTube. It has also exceeded 1.8 billion streams on Spotify.
In June 2021, The music video has achieved over 1 billion views making it Grande's 6th music video to achieve a big milestone since No Tears Left To Cry.

Synopsis

The video begins outside a house with many women posing on cars and caressing each other. Next, the title appears, reading out "7 Rings" (and written in Japanese as "七つの指輪"). The song then begins with Grande outside showing a far shot showing Grande and many other women, which then transitions to Grande in the kitchen with added pink LED lights around her. She is shown wearing jewelry around her neck, and ears, and some on her hair. She also sports pink hair extensions. The scene then moves to a party that shows Grande and backup dancers dancing, and drinking wine. Afterwards, the next scene depicts Grande in front of a tower of plastic-glass cups that are all filled with water. The scene after shows Grande pouring a wine bottle over them and also shows Grande's real-life friends including Alexa Luria and singer/songwriter Victoria Monét (who also contributed songwriting to the track). The next scene then shows Grande laying down on the staircase with Rapunzel-inspired ponytail, also signifying her ex-boyfriend Pete Davidson's apartment. While also still showing scenes earlier in the video, a scene also shows Grande pouring a wine bottle over the tower of cups which end up falling down. The next scene involves a Barbie-inspired house showing Grande in a pink latex outfit (similar to Dangerous Woman). It then shows Grande ripping the wallpaper giving availability for her to peek inside. The final change is of Grande in a room with green lights giving resemblance to Wicked. The final scenes are of Grande outside with all her friends and backup dancers including her dog Toulouse. In conclusion, it shows Grande saying "My bitches right here" which leads to the ending of the music video.

Controversies

Grande was accused by American rapper Princess Nokia for plagiarism of her song "Mine". American rappers Soulja Boy and 2 Chainz also accused Grande of plagiarizing their respective songs "Pretty Boy Swag" and "Spend It". However, after severe backlash from fans, Princess Nokia deleted the video accusing Grande around the same time the remix with 2 Chainz was released. Grande would later appear on the track "Rule the World" from 2 Chainz's fifth studio album Rap or Go to the League (2019).

Grande was subject to criticism and some ridicule after getting a tattoo commemorative of the song which read  「七輪」(Shichirin) in Japanese. While the kanji that comprise the word literally translate to "seven" and "ring" respectively, shichirin commonly refers to a specific type of small barbecue grill or brazier. A later attempt to fix the tattoo by the addition of the character yubi (指, lit. "Finger") beneath 「七」, to give 「七指輪」Shichi yubiwa (yubiwa meaning "ring", as in the piece of jewelry) only drew further criticism.

Track listing
Digital download
"7 Rings" – 2:58

Digital download – Remix 
"7 Rings (Remix)" featuring 2 Chainz – 2:58

7-inch vinyl – cassette
"7 Rings" (Explicit) – 2:58
"7 Rings" (Edited) – 2:58

Credits and personnel
Credits adapted from Tidal and Thank U, Nexts liner notes.

Recording
 Recorded at Jungle City Studios (New York City, New York) and The Record Plant (Hollywood, California)
 Mixed at MixStar Studios (Virginia Beach, Virginia)
 Mastered at Sterling Sound (New York City, New York)

Management
 Published by Universal Music Group Corp. (ASCAP), GrandAri Music (ASCAP), Victoria Monét Music Publishing (ASCAP), Taylor Monét Music/Warner Chappell (BMI), OWSLA (ASCAP) and District 1-12/Avex Music Publishing (ASCAP)
 Contains a sample from "My Favorite Things", written by Oscar Hammerstein II and Richard Rodgers, published by Williamson Music Co. (ASCAP)

Production

 Ariana Grande – vocals, songwriter, vocal producer
 Victoria Monét – backing vocals, songwriter, vocal producer
 Tayla Parx – backing vocals, songwriter
 Njomza Vitia – songwriter
 Kimberly Krysiuk – songwriter
 Tommy Brown – songwriter, producer, programming
 Michael Foster – songwriter,  producer, programming
 Charles Anderson – songwriter, producer, programming
 Richard Rodgers – songwriter
 Oscar Hammerstein II – songwriter
 Billy Hickey – recording
 Brendan Morawski – recording
 Sean Klein – recording assistant
 Serban Ghenea – mixing
 John Hanes – mixing engineer
 Calabasas Sound – mastering
 2 Chainz – featured artist 
 Finis "KY" White – vocal mixing

Charts

Weekly charts

Remix

Monthly charts

Year-end charts

Decade-end charts

Certifications and sales

Release history

See also

 List of most-streamed songs on Spotify
 List of number-one singles of 2019 (Australia)
 List of Canadian Hot 100 number-one singles of 2019
 List of number-one digital songs of 2019 (Canada)
 List of number-one singles of 2019 (Finland)
 List of number-one singles of the 2010s (Hungary)
 List of number-one singles of 2019 (Ireland)
 List of number-one songs of 2019 (Malaysia)
 List of number-one singles from the 2010s (New Zealand)
 List of number-one songs in Norway
 List of number-one singles of 2019 (Portugal)
 List of number-one songs of 2019 (Singapore)
 List of number-one singles of the 2010s (Sweden)
 List of number-one hits of 2019 (Switzerland)
 List of UK Singles Chart number ones of the 2010s
 List of Billboard Hot 100 number-one singles of 2019
 List of Billboard Hot 100 top 10 singles in 2019
 List of number-one digital songs of 2019 (U.S.)
 List of number-one Billboard Streaming Songs of 2019

References

2019 singles
2018 songs
Ariana Grande songs
Billboard Hot 100 number-one singles
Canadian Hot 100 number-one singles
Irish Singles Chart number-one singles
Music videos directed by Hannah Lux Davis
Number-one singles in Australia
Number-one singles in Finland
Number-one singles in Greece
Number-one singles in Hungary
Number-one singles in Iceland
Number-one singles in Israel
Number-one singles in Malaysia
Number-one singles in New Zealand
Number-one singles in Norway
Number-one singles in Portugal
Number-one singles in Singapore
Number-one singles in Sweden
Number-one singles in Switzerland
Republic Records singles
Songs involved in plagiarism controversies
Songs involved in royalties controversies
Songs with lyrics by Oscar Hammerstein II
Songs with music by Richard Rodgers
Songs written by Ariana Grande
Songs written by Tayla Parx
Songs written by Victoria Monét
Songs written by Charles Anderson
Songs written by Tommy Brown (record producer)
Song recordings produced by Tommy Brown (record producer)
Song recordings produced by Charles Anderson
Songs about friendship
The Sound of Music
Trap music songs
UK Singles Chart number-one singles
Songs about consumerism
Race-related controversies in music